Dvor is a municipality in the Banovina region in central Croatia. Administratively it belongs to the Sisak-Moslavina County and is located across the Una River from Novi Grad in Bosnia and Herzegovina. Dvor is an underdeveloped municipality which is statistically classified as the First Category Area of Special State Concern by the Government of Croatia.

Languages and names
The town of Dvor was named Dvor na Uni in the Kingdom of Yugoslavia. As a majority of the present-day inhabitants are Serbs, the Serbian language is co-official as a second official language, alongside Croatian, which is the official first language.

History
Dvor used to be a district capital in the historic Zagreb County, an administrative unit within the Kingdom of Croatia-Slavonia, which ceased to exist in 1918. In 1929 Dvor was placed in Vrbas Banovina within Kingdom of Yugoslavia. It was not incorporated into Croatia when the Banovina of Croatia province was formed in 1939. In 1941, the town became a part of the Independent State of Croatia. After the end of World War II the town officially became part of SR Croatia within SFR Yugoslavia, which largely followed the historic border of the Kingdom of Croatia-Slavonia in this area.

During the Croatian War of Independence (1991–1995), Dvor was within the breakaway Republic of Serbian Krajina, but following Operation Storm in 1995 the municipality returned to Croatian control. Most of Serbian population was evacuated from Dvor during the Operation Storm of which some had returned.

Demographics

According to Population Censuses, the majority of the population are ethnic Serbs. Between 1991 and 2011 the number of Serb residents fell from 14,555 to 4,005, a drop from 86.5% of the population to 71.9%. The number of Croat residents remained essentially the same, 1,395 and 1,440, respectively, but given the population decline, its size, as a percentage of the population, rose from 9.58% to 25.85% of the population of Dvor.

Religion

Serbian Orthodox Church of Saint George
Serbian Orthodox Church of Saint George was constructed in short period of 6 months in 1880. The construction was supported by baron Franjo Filipović who donated 12000 Forintas for this task. As the building was constructed in relative rush it was perceived as mediocre in architectural style and therefore during its reconstruction in 1957 major adaptations were done on the basis of the model of church in Javoranj. Interior frescoes from 1904 are, together with religious elements, representing also the Kosovo Cycle.

Roman Catholic Chapel of Saint Peter and Paul
Roman Catholic Chapel of Saint Peter and Paul was constructed in 1848. It served as the model for larger orthodox church in the village. It was reconstructed in 1971, then destroyed in 1991 during the Croatian War of Independence when the village was a part of self-proclaimed Republic of Serbian Krajina, and was reconstructed once again after the end of war.

Settlements
According to the 2011 census, the municipality consists of 64 settlements:

 Bansko Vrpolje - 65
 Buinja - 10
 Buinjski Riječani - 12
 Čavlovica - 2
 Ćore - 33
 Divuša - 63
 Donja Oraovica - 41
 Donja Stupnica - 87
 Donji Dobretin - 20
 Donji Javoranj - 149
 Donji Žirovac - 46
 Draškovac - 22
 Dvor - 1,406
 Gage - 66
 Glavičani - 19
 Golubovac Divuški - 85
 Gorička - 109
 Gornja Oraovica - 36
 Gornja Stupnica - 61
 Gornji Dobretin - 9
 Gornji Javoranj - 65
 Gornji Žirovac - 22
 Grabovica - 32
 Grmušani - 118
 Gvozdansko - 42
 Hrtić - 112
 Javnica - 48
 Javornik - 107
 Jovac - 20
 Kepčije - 74
 Kobiljak - 0
 Komora - 15
 Kosna - 35
 Kotarani - 3
 Kozibrod - 70
 Kuljani - 98
 Lotine - 43
 Ljeskovac - 57
 Ljubina - 100
 Majdan - 11
 Matijevići - 645
 Ostojići - 5
 Paukovac - 67
 Pedalj - 59
 Rogulje - 29
 Rudeži - 1
 Rujevac - 254
 Sočanica - 23
 Stanić Polje - 16
 Struga Banska - 115
 Šakanlije - 32
 Šegestin - 35
 Švrakarica - 53
 Trgovi - 100
 Udetin - 45
 Unčani - 189
 Vanići - 81
 Volinja - 77
 Zakopa - 70
 Zamlača - 144
 Zrin - 18
 Zrinska Draga - 35
 Zrinski Brđani - 63
 Zut - 1

Three of the villages: Čavlovica, Kobiljak and Zut, have not yet been re-connected to the public electrical grid.

See also
 Banovina
 Dvor massacre

References

External links

Official website 

Municipalities of Croatia
Populated places in Sisak-Moslavina County
Banovina
Bosnia and Herzegovina–Croatia border crossings
Serb communities in Croatia
Zagreb County (former)